JNJ-18038683 is a potent and selective antagonist of the 5HT7 serotonin receptor discovered by Johnson & Johnson. It has nootropic and antidepressant effects in both animal and human studies and has progressed to Phase II trials as an adjunctive treatment for improving cognition and mood in stable bipolar disorder; it has been found to reduce REM sleep (the lightest stage of sleep, elevated in depression) in humans and block circadian rhythm phase-shift advances in mice.

It binds to the 5-HT6 serotonin receptor with 10x less affinity. At relevant doses, inhibition of 5-HT6 would be expected to render pro-cognitive and anti-dementia effects.

References 

Serotonin receptor antagonists
Nitrogen heterocycles